Minuscule 566 (in the Gregory-Aland numbering), ε 93 (Soden), also known as the Empress Theodora's Codex. It is a Greek minuscule manuscript of the New Testament, on parchment, dated palaeographically to the 9th century.

Description 

The codex contains the text of Gospel of Matthew and Gospel of Mark on 259 parchment leaves (size ). 
The text is written in two columns per page, 23 lines per page, in early minuscule letters.

It has the famous Jerusalem Colophon : .
There are some marginal notes in uncial letters were made.

It contains scholia at the margin in small uncial script. According to Tischendorf scholion to the Gospel of Matthew cites the Gospel of the Hebrews:
 Matthew 4:5 το ιουδαικον ουκ εχει εις την αγιαν πολιν αλλ εν ιλημ
 Matthew  16:17 Βαριωνα το ιουδαικον υιε ιωαννου
 Matthew  18:22 το ιουδαικον εξης εχει μετα το εβδομηκοντακις επτα και γαρ εν τοις προφηταις μετα το χρισθηναι αυτους εν πνι αγιω ευρισκετω εν αυτοις λογος αμαρτιας
 Matthew 26:47 το ιουδαικου και ηρνησατο και ωμοσεν και κατηρασατο.

Phrase "το ιουδαικου" probably means Gospel of the Hebrews.

Text 

The Greek text of the codex Aland did not place in any Category.

History 

De Muralt dated the manuscript to the 9th or 10th century. Currently it is dated by the INTF to the 9th-century.

The manuscript was brought by Constantin von Tischendorf in 1859. The manuscripts was examined and described by Tischendorf (along with the codices 565, 568-572, 574, 575, and 1567), by Tregelles, Eduard de Muralt, and Kurt Treu.

Formerly it was bounded in one manuscript with Codex Tischendorfianus III.

The codex now is located at the National Library of Russia (Gr. 54, 121 fol.; Gr. 282, 1 fol.) at Saint Petersburg.

See also 
 List of New Testament minuscules
 Purple parchment
 Textual criticism

References

Further reading 
 Constantin von Tischendorf, Notitia editionis codicis Bibliorum Sinaitici (Leipzig: 1860), pp. 58–59.
 Eduard de Muralt, Catalogue des manuscrits grecs de la Bibliothèque Impériale publique (Petersburg 1864), pp. 30–31.
 Kurt Treu, Die griechischen Handschriften des Neuen Testaments in der UdSSR; eine systematische Auswertung des Texthandschriften in Leningrad, Moskau, Kiev, Odessa, Tbiblisi und Erevan, Texte und Untersuchungen 91 (Berlin, 1966), pp. 48–50.
 A. Schmidtke, Neue Fragmente und  Untersuchungen zu den judenchristlichen Evangelien, T & U 37/1 (Leipzig, 1911), pp. 1–31.

External links 
 Image from the codex (the Eusebian tables) at the RNB

Greek New Testament minuscules
9th-century biblical manuscripts
National Library of Russia collection